The following are the national records in athletics in North Korea maintained by Amateur Athletic Association of DPR of Korea.

Outdoor

Key to tables:

h = hand timing

Men

Women

Indoor

Men

Women

See also

Sport in North Korea
List of South Korean records in athletics

References

North Korea
Records
Athletics
Athletics